Lauren Elizabeth Mueller (born November 15, 1991) is an American mixed martial artist, currently in the Bantamnweight division of the Invicta FC. A professional competitor since 2015, she has also competed in the UFC and Gladiator Challenge.

Background
Mueller did motorcross, softball and volleyball among others growing up, eventually picking up mixed martial arts after high school. She stopped working as a full-time nurse to pursue a career in the sport.

Mixed martial arts career

Early career
Lauren Mueller made her mixed martial arts debut in 2015, during Gladiator Challenge - Contenders, when she faced Peggy Ross. She won the fight by unanimous decision. Fighting with the same organization, she won another unanimous decision against Hannah Fitzpatrick and scored a TKO win over Faye Shields.

In 2017 she fought under Dana White's Contender Series at Dana White's Contender Series 8 against Kelly McGill-Velasco, and won a unanimous decision. This victory earned her a contract with the UFC.

Ultimate Fighting Championship
Mueller made her UFC debut as a replacement for Wu Yanan, fighting Shana Dobson at UFC on Fox: Poirier vs. Gaethje, on five weeks notice. Mueller won the fight through a unanimous decision.

She was then scheduled to fight against Wu Yanan during UFC Fight Night: Blaydes vs. Ngannou 2. Mueller suffered her first professional loss, losing by way of an armbar in the first round.

During UFC 236 she fought Poliana Botelho replacing injured Paige VanZant. She lost a unanimous decision.

During UFC Fight Night: Joanna vs. Waterson Mueller faced JJ Aldrich.  She would lose a unanimous decision.

Mueller was released from UFC in December 2019.

Invicta Fighting Championships 
Mueller faced Serena DeJesus at Invicta FC 44: A New Era on August 27, 2021. Mueller lost via split decision.

Mueller was scheduled to face Claire Guthrie on January 12, 2022 at Invicta FC 45. The bout was scratched due to unknown reasons.

Mixed martial arts record
 

|-
|Loss
|align=center|5–4
|Serena DeJesus
|Decision (split)
|Invicta FC 44: A New Era
|
|align=center|3
|align=center|5:00
|Kansas City, Kansas, United States
|
|-
|Loss
|align=center|5–3
|JJ Aldrich
|Decision (unanimous)
|UFC Fight Night: Joanna vs. Waterson
|
|align=center|3
|align=center|5:00
|Tampa, Florida, United States
|
|-
|Loss
|align=center|5–2
|Poliana Botelho
|Decision (unanimous)
|UFC 236
|
|align=center|3
|align=center|5:00
|Atlanta, Georgia, United States
|
|-
|Loss
|align=center|5–1
|Wu Yanan
|Submission (armbar)
|UFC Fight Night: Blaydes vs. Ngannou 2
|
|align=center|1
|align=center|4:00
|Beijing, China
|
|-
|Win
|align=center|5–0
|Shana Dobson
|Decision (unanimous)
|UFC on Fox: Poirier vs. Gaethje 
|
|align=center|3
|align=center|5:00
|Glendale, Arizona, United States
|
|-
|Win
|align=center|4–0
|Kelly McGill-Velasco
|Decision (unanimous)
|Dana White's Contender Series 8
|
|align=center|3
|align=center|5:00
|Las Vegas, Nevada, United States
|
|-
|Win
|align=center|3–0
|Hannah Fitzpatrick
|Decision (unanimous)
|Gladiator Challenge - Freedom Strikes
|
|align=center|3
|align=center|5:00
|El Cajon, California, United States
|
|-
|Win
|align=center|2–0
|Faye Shields
|TKO (submission to punches)
|Gladiator Challenge - MMA Smackdown
|
|align=center|1
|align=center|1:01
|El Cajon, California, United States
|
|-
|Win
|align=center|1–0
|Peggy Ross
|Decision (unanimous)
|Gladiator Challenge - Contenders
|
|align=center|3
|align=center|5:00
|El Cajon, California, United States
|
|-
|}

See also
List of female mixed martial artists

List of current UFC fighters

References

External links
 
 

1991 births
Living people
Bantamweight mixed martial artists
Flyweight mixed martial artists
Ultimate Fighting Championship female fighters